Klubi i Futbolit Himara was an Albanian football club based in the town of Himarë, formerly part of Vlorë District. The club's home ground was Petro Ruci Stadium and they last competed in the Albanian Second Division.

History
Founded in 1932, they have also played under the name Vetëtima Himarë. Their president Lorenc Gjikuria threatened to pull the club out of the league in May 2014 only to change their minds and play the last match of that league season.

References

External links
Second Division Standings and Stats

Himare
Himara
1932 establishments in Albania
Association football clubs established in 1932
Kategoria e Dytë clubs